Chithara  is a village in Kollam district in the state of Kerala, India.

Demographics
 India census, Chithara had a population of 20694 with 9727 males and 10967 females.

State Government Offices
 Chithara, Sub Registrar Office
 KSEB Section Office
 Krishi Bhavan, Chithara
 Chithara Police Station

Educational Institutions

 Apple Kids International School
 Sree Narayana Higher Secondary School - CHITHARA(Paruthy)
 GLPS CHITHARA
 A.P.R.M. Central School
 Almanar LPS Valavupacha
 Govt. Higher Secondary School 
 B.Ed. College
 UPS Pezhumoodu
 Mathira L P S
 PALPU COLLEGE MATHIRA
 GUPS THOOTTICKAL MATHIRA

References

Villages in Kollam district